Christian Martin Julius Frauenstädt (April 17, 1813, Bojanowo, Posen – January 13, 1879, Berlin) was a German student of philosophy. He was educated at the house of his uncle at Neisse, and converted from Judaism to Christianity in 1833. Studying theology and, later, philosophy at Berlin, where he also worked as a private tutor.  In Berlin, he met the philosopher Arthur Schopenhauer and took up his residence in 1848.

Frauenstädt was a disciple of Arthur Schopenhauer, as is shown by his works. He wrote:

 Studien und Kritiken zur Theologie und Philosophie, Berlin, 1840
 Ueber das Wahre Verhältniss der Vernunft zur Offenbarung, Darmstadt, 1848
 Aesthetische Fragen, Dessau, 1853
 Die Naturwissenschaft in Ihrem Einfluss auf Poesie, Religion, Moral, und Philosophie, 1855
 Der Materialismus, Seine Wahrheit und Sein Irrthum, 1856 (written against Ludwig Büchner)
 Briefe über die Natürliche Religion, 1858
 Lichtstrahlen aus Immanuel Kant's Werken, 1872.

Schopenhauer made Frauenstädt his literary executor, to undertake the editing of his works. Among Frauenstädt's works relating especially to Schopenhauer are:

 Briefe über die Schopenhauer'sche Philosophie, Leipzig, 1854
 Lichtstrahlen aus Schopenhauer's Werken, 1862, 7th ed. 1891 (with Otto Lindner)
 Schopenhauer, von Ihm und über Ihn, Berlin, 1863
 Aus Schopenhauer's Handschriftlichem Nachlass, Leipzig, 1864
 Das Sittliche Leben, 1866
 Blicke in die Intellektuelle, Physische, und Moralische Welt, 1869; Schopenhauer-Lexikon, 1871
 Neue Briefe über die Schopenhauer'sche Philosophie, 1876.

He edited Gesammtausgabe der Werke Schopenhauers, 6 vols., 1873–74, 2d ed. 1877.

References

Bibliography 
 Andreas Daum, Wissenschaftspopularisierung im 19. Jahrhundert: Bürgerliche Kultur, naturwissenschaftliche Bildung und die deutsche Öffentlichkeit, 1848–1914. Munich: Oldenbourg, 1998. 
F. A. de Le Roi, Geschichte der Evangelischen Judenmission (2 vols.), 1899 , p. 215; 
 Meyers Konversations-Lexikon

1813 births
1879 deaths
People from Rawicz County
19th-century German Jews
Converts to Christianity from Judaism
19th-century German philosophers
Jewish philosophers
People from the Grand Duchy of Posen
Humboldt University of Berlin alumni
19th-century German writers
19th-century German male writers